Wildfire Studios is a video game developer that was established in 1995. It is based in Brisbane, Australia.

Wildfire has developed several pinball games for video game publishers, but their most recent games are released through RealNetworks.

Portfolio 
 Jungo, self-published
 Danny Phantom Ghost Frenzy, published by Nickelodeon
 Tumblebugs, published by Realarcade
 Balls of Steel, published by Pinball Wizards (see 3D Realms)
 Kiss Pinball, Global Star Software (named after band Kiss)
 Dirt Track Racing Pinball, Ratbag Games
 Austin Powers Pinball, Gotham Games and Global Star Software (named after film series Austin Powers)
 Devil's Island Pinball, self-published
 Tumblebugs 2, published by Big Fish Games

RealNetworks games 
 Balls of Steel: Creature Attack!
 Devil's Island Pinball
 Tumblebugs

WiiWare games
 Tumblebugs, published by Gameshastra

External links 
 Wildfire Studios Official website
 Jungo Official website

Video game companies of Australia
Video game companies established in 1995
Video game development companies